Michael Paul Vernon Barrett (born September 18, 1949) is Academic Dean and Professor of Old Testament at Puritan Reformed Theological Seminary and was formerly president of Geneva Reformed Seminary and an associate minister of Faith Free Presbyterian Church, Greenville, South Carolina, a congregation of the Free Presbyterian Church of North America.  

Converted to Christianity as a child, Barrett was called to the Christian ministry early in his college career at Bob Jones University.  He earned his doctorate in Old Testament Text at BJU with a special focus on Semitic languages. For almost thirty years, he was professor of Ancient Languages and Old Testament Theology and Interpretation at BJU.

Barrett assumed the presidency of Geneva Reformed Seminar in the fall of 2000. In the 2009 GRS bulletin, he emphasized his conviction that the seminary connect "head and heart—the intellect and devotion" and that it have an "unapologetic and uncompromising commitment to a Reformed theology that is Christ-centered, biblical, evangelistic, and separatist." 

Formerly a member of the Reformed Presbyterian Church, Evangelical Synod, Barrett helped to establish the Free Presbyterian Church in the United States during the late 1970s and 1980s and served for many years under Alan Cairns in the Greenville assembly. He is a member of the Evangelical Theological Society and the author of a half dozen books and numerous articles in both professional and popular religious journals. 

In 2002, the conservative Baptist Bulletin recommended Barrett's Beginning at Moses to counter what it believed to be a common ignorance of Christ's presence in the Old Testament. Of Barrett's Love Divine and Unfailing, Joel Beeke of Puritan Reformed Theological Seminary has written that it "is a clear, honest, panoramic treatment of the book of Hosea....a masterpiece in expounding God’s loving and gracious covenant [and] a sheer delight to read." In 2009 R. Albert Mohler, Jr. listed the book as "one of the ten books every preacher should read this year."

In 2019, a Festschrift, The Old Testament Yesterday and Today: Essays in Honor of Michael P.V. Barrett, was published in his honor. The articles included contributions from Joel R. Beeke and Walter C. Kaiser Jr.

Barrett and his wife, Sandra, have two sons and five grandchildren. He is an avid hunter.

Sources
 Current biography: https://prts.edu/profile/dr-michael-barrett/
 GRS biography

Books
Beginning at Moses: A Guide to Finding Christ in the Old Testament (Ambassador-Emerald International, 1999)
Complete in Him: A Guide to Understanding and Enjoying the Gospel (Ambassador-Emerald International, 2000) 
God’s Unfailing Purpose: The Message of Daniel (Ambassador-Emerald International (2003) 
The Beauty of Holiness: A Guide to Biblical Worship (Ambassador-Emerald International, 2006)
Love Divine and Unfailing: The Gospel According to Hosea (P & R Publishing, 2008)
The Hebrew Handbook (BJU Press, 4th ed., 1994)

1949 births
Writers from Greenville, South Carolina
Leaders of Christian parachurch organizations
Presbyterian writers
Converts to Christianity
American Presbyterian ministers
American Calvinist and Reformed theologians
Living people
Bob Jones University alumni
Bob Jones University faculty
20th-century Calvinist and Reformed theologians
21st-century Calvinist and Reformed theologians